Lajos Bebrits (14 December 1891 – 9 August 1963) was a Hungarian communist newspaper editor and politician. He is best remembered in the United States as the long-time editor of Új Előre (New Forward), the Hungarian language newspaper of the Communist Party USA. Bebrits was deported by the United States government in 1932, living in the Soviet Union until the end of World War II. He was arrested during the Great Terror in 1938 and spent 21 months in prison before being released through prosecutorial review of his case. After the end of the Second World War, Bebrits returned to communist Hungary, where he was elected a member of parliament.

Biography

Early years

Lajos Bebrits was born December 14, 1891 in Teregova, in the Krassó-Szörény County of the Kingdom of Hungary (now in Caraș-Severin County, Romania).

Political career

Bebrits joined the Social Democratic Party of Hungary in 1917.

Between 1923 and 1932 Bebrits lived in the United States, where he served as the head of the Hungarian section of the Communist Party USA and on the editorial staff of Új Előre (New Forward), the official organ of the Hungarian-American communist organization.

Bebrits came under scrutiny of the U.S. Department of Justice as a resident alien communist and was deported to the Soviet Union in 1932. In 1934 he wrote a book on the differences between life in the United States and Soviet Russia.

In 1938, during the Great Purge which swept the USSR, Bebrits was arrested on charges of espionage, accused of having participated in a "Trotskyist conspiracy." He remained in prison for some 21 months, fortunately gaining his release in 1939 due to prosecutorial review of the evidence in his case.

Following World War II, Bebrits returned to Hungary, where he served as State Minister for Transport and Post and as a member of the National Assembly.

In 1957, Bebrits was named Hungarian ambassador to Sweden, Norway, and Iceland. He remained in that post for two years.

From 1959, Bebrits served as head of the Hungarian National Tourist Board, retiring from that post in 1962.

Death and legacy

Bebrits died August 9, 1963 in Budapest. He was 72 years old at the time of his death.

Works
 Tisztelt elvtárs!... USA. vagy USSR? (Comrades!... USA or USSR?) Moscow: A Szovetunióban élő külföldi munkások kiadóvállalata (Publishing Society of Foreign Workers in the USSR), 1934.
 Négy ország viharaiban. Bebrits Lajos élete. (Four Storms of the Country: The Life of Lajos Bebrits) With Gyula Kékesdi. Budapest: n.p., 1967.

References 

1891 births
1963 deaths
People from Caraș-Severin County
People from the Kingdom of Hungary
Social Democratic Party of Hungary politicians
Members of the Communist Party USA
Members of the Hungarian Working People's Party
Members of the Hungarian Socialist Workers' Party
Government ministers of Hungary
Members of the National Assembly of Hungary (1945–1947)
Members of the National Assembly of Hungary (1947–1949)
Members of the National Assembly of Hungary (1949–1953)
Members of the National Assembly of Hungary (1953–1958)
People deported from the United States
Hungarian expatriates in the Soviet Union